CHLY 101.7 FM is a campus radio station based in Nanaimo, British Columbia, Canada. Primarily funded by students of Vancouver Island University's Nanaimo campus, the station is also supported by donations and memberships from the community, as well as sponsorship and advertising from local businesses.

CHLY-FM is run by the Radio Malaspina Society, an incorporated non-profit society with a mission to broadcast an FM radio signal of 3,000 watts its broadcast community. From its broadcast site at Cottle Hill, CHLY's broadcast signal covers much of the Salish Sea, reaching as far north as Campbell River, as far south as the Cowichan Valley, Southern Gulf Islands, east to the southern Sunshine Coast, and parts of the Lower Mainland.  The station had its beginnings on the Internet on April 1, 2000, before gaining its broadcasting licence from the Canadian Radio-television and Telecommunications Commission (CRTC) on June 5. CHLY aired a test signal at 101.7 FM on September 21, and ran promotional material about the station for two weeks before officially signing on at 6:00 p.m. on October 5, 2001.

CHLY's studio is located in the basement of the Queens Hotel on Victoria Crescent in downtown Nanaimo. The station features an eclectic format with a variety of music genres (including jazz, reggae, alternative rock, hip-hop, roots music, folk and electronica) and programs reporting on issues of the campus, local community and the world.

CHLY is a member of the National Campus and Community Radio Association.

References

External links 
 CHLY-FM
 
 

Hly
Hly
Vancouver Island University
Radio stations established in 2001
2001 establishments in British Columbia